Extreme Guide to Parenting is an American reality television series that premiered August 7, 2014, on Bravo. Each episode features different households with alternative styles of raising their children.

Episodes

Reception
Extreme Guide to Parenting has received mixed reviews with a score of 55 based on 4 reviews. Allison Keene of The Hollywood Reporter was positive about the show and noted that it "manages to hit upon some universal parenting problems." Brian Lowry of Variety said the show has the potential to become the guiltiest of pleasures. Rob Owen of Pittsburgh Post-Gazette, however, was more critical and said that the show could have worked but was "ruined by an over-long running time."

References

External links
 
 
 

2010s American reality television series
2014 American television series debuts
2014 American television series endings
English-language television shows
Bravo (American TV network) original programming